Tsoghamarg is a village in the Ashotsk Municipality of the Shirak Province of Armenia. It was founded by migrants from Sebastea.

Demographics

References 

Populated places in Shirak Province